Pinochetism is a right-wing to far-right personalist political ideology based on the principles of anti-communism, conservatism, authoritarianism, militarism, patriotism, nationalism, and neoliberalism. The ideology is inspired in Chilean dictator Augusto Pinochet, who headed the military dictatorship from 1973 to 1990. Former and current supporters of said dictatorship are known as pinochetistas.

History

Military dictatorship 
Upon assuming power, the military dictatorship took as its first measure to ban left-wing parties, with the well-known persecution of their militants. Regarding the other parties, it orders their suspension "until further notice" (Band No. 1 of the Military Junta), however, many militants from right-wing parties plus some Christian Democrats and radicals actively collaborated with the new regime but were unable to demonstrate. your thoughts openly. The first lady and wife of Pinochet, Lucía Hiriart brought together the Pinochet women through CEMA Chile, an institution that she directed from 1973 to 2016. This institution had more than 500,000 members and had a large budget for its operation. The Spanish politician Blas Piñar supported the Chilean dictatorship and declared himself an admirer of Pinochet's work, meeting him on several occasions in Chile and Spain. During the 70s, all party political activity was prohibited. It was not until 1980, that with the promulgation of the new constitution, the organization of political groups was allowed.
Between 1980 and 1987, various support groups for the dictatorship emerged, such as the National Action Movement, National Labour Front, the National Unity Youth Front. National Union Movement, and the Independent Democratic Union Movement. The fascist and ultra-nationalist National Advance was a party that focused its positions on the figure of Pinochet, and in which many of its militants were members of the National Information Center, which is why this party obtained very low votes in the 1989 elections, disappearing when not the legal minimum is obtained. The dictatorship also enjoyed support from other fascist groups such as the Movimiento Revolucionario Nacional Sindicalista and others that, after a power struggle with the liberal-conservative right, left power, mainly due to the criticism of said groups for the neoliberal leadership that the regime acquired. 

This struggle was won by the liberal-conservative sectors like National Renewal (Renovación Nacional) and Independent Democratic Union (Unión Democrática Independiente) linked to the Universidad Católica, who due to their social origins had a large and important network of contacts. In addition, the military authorities, in a show of pragmatism, trusted the neoliberal currents more than the nationalist ones because they considered that through the economy they could insert Chile into the international context, due to the fact that the regime was politically isolated; there was even a time of ostracism in which the Andean country integrated the so-called "triangle Santiago-Brasilia-Jerusalem-Pretoria", made up of pariah states, such as Apartheid South Africa or Israel.

In 1987 the law on political parties was promulgated, a rule with which political parties could begin to formally operate, with the exception of the Communist Party and any organization of similar ideologies, a proscription that was based on article 8 of the constitution. In that same year The Great Front of Chile was formed for included other organizations that supported Pinochet, such as Acción Gremialist, the Civic Action Committees and the Pinochetist Independent Movement. The latter was founded on April 19, 1987 by Abraham Abrilot, defining the group as nationalist and exclusively supporting the figure of Pinochet. Its symbol consisted of a pedestal that contained the map of Chile horizontally, and on it the national coat of arms. It defined itself not as a political collectivity, but as "an independent and apolitical body" that aspired to "unite the great mass of Chileans" unaffiliated with any ideology. 

Later, the Pinochetist Independent Movement installed canvases in support of Pinochet on the front of his headquarters—which led to the application of fines by the Municipality of Santiago—and protests during events of parties and political groups opposed to the dictatorship. At the end of March 1988, the leadership of the movement headed by Abrilot was dismissed, which was accused of "lack of capacity to exercise the position of president and arbitrariness in decision-making", after which the presidency was assumed by Ricardo Valenzuela. In the run-up to the plebiscite on October 5, 1988, they called for a "Yes" vote, having previously indicated that it would call for a "No" vote in the event that the nominated candidate was not Pinochet. After the victory of the "No" option, the Pinochet parties would decline.

1998-present 

In 1998, after Pinochet's arrest in London, UDI senator Iván Moreira went on a hunger strike for five days for his release. In 2013, he repented of said act and described it as "pathetic". In 2001, Chilean director Marcela Said released her documentary I Love Pinochet, which shows Pinochet's supporters after his arrest in London. Public figures such as Raul Hasbún, Fernando Barros, Cristián Labbé, Patricia Maldonado, Francisco Javier Cuadra, Joaquín Lavín, Hermógenes Pérez de Arce appear in the film, as well as anonymous Pinochetists from different social classes. Starting in 2004, part of the Chilean democratic right-wing gradually distanced itself from the figure of Pinochet, "when it was discovered that he had multimillion-dollar bank accounts abroad", which dismantled his image of austerity. 

In July 2007, Gonzalo Townsend Pinochet, the nephew of the late Augusto Pinochet, announced through Internet media the creation of a political party that would be born from the Unitary Pinochet Action movement, which brought together Pinochet supporters and was led by Townsend. This party would have been called the National Liberation Party, because Townsend was not allowed by law to use his uncle's last name. Finally, the political community failed to register in the electoral registers. In September of that same year, the intention on the part of retired soldiers to form a new Pinochetist political party came to light, which would be called the Metropolitan Military Party, because it was focused on the Santiago Metropolitan Region.

In 2014, Augusto Pinochet Molina, using his grandfather Augusto Pinochet as a reference, founded and led a liberal right-wing movement with Pinochetist influences. In mid-April 2015, he registered it as a political party in formation under the name of Partido Orden Republicano Mi Patria, although the press would know it as Por mi Patria. Former Brazilian President Jair Bolsonaro openly declares himself an admirer of Pinochet and radical racist groups in the United States claim him on T-shirts. During a meeting of the UN, the former president of Chile, Michelle Bachelet spoke about Brazilian "police violence", to which Bolsonaro responded by saying "Mrs. Michelle Bachelet: if it were not for the staff of (Augusto) Pinochet, who defeated the left in 1973, including his father, today Chile would be a Cuba".

In the midst of a wave of reactionary conservatism, in 2018, it re-emerged as a trend. This tendency is embodied by the conservative politician José Antonio Kast and the Republican Party, indirectly. The Republican Party founded in 2019 is today the main group of "organic Pinochetism", the new far-right in Chile, with the party receiving increasing support as centre-left and center-right parties began to reach a point of political convergence in the area policies and a perceived collusion in corruption as scandals arose. 

The party's ideological doctrine is similar to the previously existing Gremialismo. Kast, the founder of the party had left the Independent Democratic Union in protest, believing that the party criticized Augusto Pinochet too often. Another Pinochetist movement is National Force, also founded in 2019. Among its members is a lawyer of military men convicted of human rights violations during the dictatorship. The RN militant Camila Flores (affiliated with Acción Republicana since 2018) has openly recognized himself as a Pinochetist. The same is the case with deputy Ignacio Urrutia, a member of the RN (1987-1997), UDI (2001-2018) and the Republican Party (since 2019).

See also
Acto de Chacarillas
Fujimorism
Gremialismo
Jair Bolsonaro#Political positions
New Right (South Korea)
Political positions of Ronald Reagan
Thatcherism

References

Bibliography 

Augusto Pinochet
Military dictatorship of Chile (1973–1990)
1970s economic history
1980s economic history
1990s economic history
1970s neologisms
Eponymous political ideologies
Anti-communism in Chile
Far-right politics in Chile
Neoliberalism
Politics of Chile
Right-wing ideologies
Right-wing politics in Chile
Conservatism in Chile
Authoritarianism